Xindu District  is one of two core districts of the city of Xingtai, Hebei province, China, the other being Xiangdu District.

Administrative divisions

Subdistricts:
Gangtie Road Subdistrict, Zhongxing Road Subdistrict, Dahuoquan Subdistrict, Zhangkuan Subdistrict, Zhangcun Subdistrict

Townships:
Nandaguo Township, Licun Township

References

External links

County-level divisions of Hebei
Xingtai